Peter Keith Levene, Baron Levene of Portsoken  KStJ (born 8 December 1941) is a businessman who was chairman of Lloyd's of London from 2003 until 2011 and Lord Mayor of London from 1998 to 1999.

Education

He was educated at the City of London School and then studied at the University of Manchester where he graduated with a degree in Economics and Political Science.

Life

Lord Levene is chairman of Starr Underwriting Agents Limited. Previously, he served as chairman of Lloyd's of London, the world's leading specialist insurance and reinsurance market, from 2002 to 2011, after having been vice chairman of Deutsche Bank. Prior to this, he held the position of chairman of Bankers Trust International and was formerly with both Morgan Stanley and Wasserstein Perella. He joined United Scientific Holdings in 1963, a small company which grew into a substantial supplier to UK and overseas Ministries of Defence.  He eventually rose to the post of chairman of that group, in 1981.

Subsequently, he was asked by the then Secretary of State for Defence, Michael Heseltine, to act as his Personal Advisor in the MoD, and then as Permanent Secretary in the role of Chief of Defence Procurement, a position which he held for six years. As UK National Armaments Director, he was appointed as chairman of the European National Armaments Directors 1989–1990. He thereafter held a number of Government posts, as Advisor to the Secretary of State for the Environment; to the President of the Board of Trade; and to the Chancellor of the Exchequer. He was appointed as Advisor to the Prime Minister (John Major) on Efficiency and Effectiveness from 1992 to 1997, producing a report, Efficiency Scrutiny into Construction Procurement by Government. in 1996. During this period, he also served as chairman of the Docklands Light Railway and then chairman and Chief Executive of Canary Wharf Ltd. He served as a member of the Board of Directors of J Sainsbury plc from 2001 to 2004, and of Total S.A., from 2005 to 2011, and was chairman of General Dynamics UK Ltd until 2019.

He served as an Alderman of the City of London from 1994 to 2012 and as Sheriff of London from 1995 to 1996.  He was Lord Mayor of London for the year 1998–99, in which role he presided over the Corporation of the City of London, and supported and promoted London as an international financial centre. He was appointed a Knight Commander of the Order of the British Empire (KBE) in the 1989 New Year Honours and was created a Life Peer on 22 July 1997 as Baron Levene of Portsoken, of Portsoken in the City of London; he sits as a crossbencher.

Lord Levene holds three other non-executive directorships in addition to Starr underwriting, as chairman of Tikehau Capital Europe Ltd, and on the boards of Haymarket Media Group, and[[China Construction Bank (Asia). He is a member of the House of Lords Finance Committee and was also a member of the Joint Committee on National Security Strategy. He was appointed by the Secretary of State for Defence in July 2010 to chair the Defence Reform Group, a body set up to review proposals for changes in structure in the UK Ministry of Defence. This body reported in June 2011 and their recommendations are now being implemented. He speaks French, German and Italian.

Family
Lord Levene is married to Wendy, Lady Levene, who is active in many charities. She is a trustee of the Jewish Museum. She had polymyalgia rheumatica and is a trustee of the associated charity, PMRGCA UK. In 1989, she launched HMS Argyll, a Royal Navy warship sponsored by the Worshipful Company of Paviors.
They have three children – John Levene, born 1968, Nicole Walsh, born 1969, Tim Levene – born 1973, and ten grandchildren.

Titles and honours

 Sir Peter Levene KBE (1989–1997)
 The Rt. Hon. The Lord Levene of Portsoken KBE (since 1997)
 The Rt. Hon. The Lord Mayor of London (1998–1999)
 Knight Commander of the British Empire (KBE) (1989)
 Knight of St John (KStJ) (1998)
 Commander of the Ordre national du Mérite (France, 1996)
 Knight Commander of the Order of Merit of the Federal Republic of Germany (1998)
 Order of Merit of the Republic of Hungary (1999)
 Fellow, Queen Mary University of London (1995)
 Hon DSc City University London (1998)
 Hon DSc University of London (2005)
 Insurance Leader of the Year Award 2009, St John's University, New York
 Awarded the Lloyd's Gold Medal for Services to Lloyd's, October 2011

Arms

Publications 
Levene, Peter – Send for Levene. Autobiography; introduction by Michael Heseltine. Published 2018 by Nine Elms Books, London. .

References 
Who's Who 2011

External links 
 Lord Levene awarded Gold Medal – Lord Levene awarded Gold Medal for Services to Lloyd's
 General Dynamics UK Limited – Home Page
  – Vita, published by World Economic Forum

1941 births
Living people
People from Pinner
People educated at the City of London School
Alumni of the University of Manchester
Councilmen and Aldermen of the City of London
Sheriffs of the City of London
20th-century lord mayors of London
20th-century English politicians
Levene of Portsoken
British businesspeople

Knights Commander of the Order of the British Empire
Commanders of the Ordre national du Mérite
Commanders Crosses of the Order of Merit of the Federal Republic of Germany
Recipients of the Order of Merit of the Republic of Hungary
English Jews
Jewish British politicians
21st-century English politicians
Life peers created by Elizabeth II